Siswanto may refer to:

 Siswanto (born 1984), Indonesian footballer
 Hendro Siswanto (born 1990), Indonesian footballer
 Siswanto Haidi (born 1972), Malaysian cricketer
 Fajar Legian Siswanto (born 1987),  Indonesian footballer